The Honda Indy Grand Prix of Alabama is an IndyCar Series race held at Barber Motorsports Park, a 17-turn  road course, in Birmingham, Alabama, United States. Officially announced on July 27, 2009, the inaugural event was on the weekend of April 9–11, 2010. The event  is under the management of the local group Zoom Motorsports. The venue is designed to allow for nearly 100,000 spectators and will have an estimated economic impact on Greater Birmingham of $30 million.

History
Having an IRL race at Barber became a possibility in 2007 when the league had testing session at the facility on October 12, 2007. The test would also serve in evaluating the track as a potential site for a race beginning in the 2009 season. By July 2008, IRL revealed its 2009 schedule with new races being held at Long Beach and Toronto, but not at Barber. However local officials indicated that Barber was under strong consideration for a 2010 date.

Due to the success of the testing session in 2007, Barber was selected for a full-field, three-day testing session in March 2009. Officials remained confident that the track would gain a race in the future due to the desire of the IRL to expand into the South, as well as the location of the Honda Manufacturing of Alabama plant in nearby Lincoln, Honda being an official engine supplier of IRL.

The opportunity to pursue the event came after the Detroit Indy Grand Prix was discontinued. Initially, Zoom Motorsports looked to have the Detroit race moved to Alabama for the 2009 season; however, the league decided in February 2009 to not replace the event on its schedule. With an open date available for 2010, Birmingham made its pitch to IRL officials and was selected to hold the event over Cleveland (Burke Lakefront Airport), Houston, Baltimore, Nashville, Charlotte and Portland. IRL cited both strong support from both local and state government in addition to the large crowd that attended an IRL training session in March 2009 as factors in Birmingham being selected for the race.

Past winners

Notes 
2014: Race postponed same day and shortened to 100 minutes due to lightning policy.
2018: Race suspended until Monday after 23 laps due to heavy rain. The race was resumed as a timed race with 75 minutes remaining.
2021: Race rescheduled from April 11 to April 18 after the Long Beach Grand Prix was rescheduled and to allow for network television coverage.

Indy Lights winners

References

External links
IndyCar.com race page
Champ Car Stats: Barber archive

 
Recurring sporting events established in 2010
2010 establishments in Alabama
IndyCar Series races